This page lists public opinion polls conducted for the 2002 French presidential election, which was held on 21 April 2002 with a run-off on 5 May 2002.

Unless otherwise noted, all polls listed below are compliant with the regulations of the national polling commission (Commission nationale des sondages) and utilize the quota method.

First round 
The Sofres poll conducted from 4 to 5 April 2002, marked with an asterisk (*) below, was conducted specifically for subsample data.

The publication of first-round polls was prohibited after midnight on 19 April 2002. Until the law of 19 February 2002 amended the law of 19 July 1977, the publication of voting intention polls was prohibited in the week before the election. The law of 19 February 2002 also extended the ban on the publication of polls to include surveys conducted before the electoral silence.

Graphical summary 
The averages in the graphs below were constructed using polls listed below conducted by the six major French pollsters. The graphs are smoothed 14-day weighted moving averages, using only the most recent poll conducted by any given pollster within that range (each poll weighted based on recency).

28 March to 18 April 2002

17 October 2001 to 27 March 2002

15 February to 16 October 2001

21 August 1998 to 14 February 2001

17 April 1996 to 20 August 1998

By department 
Paris

Réunion

Second round 
The Sofres poll conducted from 4 to 5 April 2002, marked with an asterisk (*) below, was conducted specifically for subsample data.

The publication of second-round polls was prohibited after midnight on 3 May 2002.

Chirac–Le Pen

Jospin–Chirac 
Graphical summary
The averages in the graphs below were constructed using polls listed below conducted by the six major French pollsters. The graphs are 14-day weighted moving averages, using only the most recent poll conducted by any given pollster within that range (each poll weighted based on recency).

By department 
Paris

Réunion

Chevènement–Chirac

Jospin–Chevènement

Aubry–Chirac

Jospin–Séguin

See also 
Opinion polling for the French legislative election, 2002
Opinion polling for the French presidential election, 2007
Opinion polling for the French presidential election, 2012
Opinion polling for the French presidential election, 2017

References

External links 
Notices of the French polling commission 

2002 French presidential election
Opinion polling in France
France